Hepscott railway station served the village of Hepscott, Northumberland, England, from 1858 to 1964 on the Blyth and Tyne Railway.

History 
The station opened on 1 April 1858 by the North Eastern Railway. It was situated at the level crossing east of the line at the north side of the village. The station was the first on the line to have two platforms, although the down platform was disused in 1914. The station closed to passengers on 3 April 1950 and closed to goods traffic on 9 March 1964.

References

External links 

Disused railway stations in Northumberland
Former North Eastern Railway (UK) stations
Railway stations in Great Britain opened in 1858
Railway stations in Great Britain closed in 1950
1858 establishments in England
1964 disestablishments in England